Wellesley Farms is an MBTA Commuter Rail station in Wellesley, Massachusetts. It serves the Framingham/Worcester Line. It is located in the Wellesley Farms area. The current station building, designed by Henry Hobson Richardson in 1886 and constructed in 1890, has been listed on the U.S. National Register of Historic Places as Wellesley Farms Railroad Station since 1986.

History

The Boston & Worcester Railroad (B&W), extending outwards from Boston, reached through the West Parish of Needham in mid-1834. Rice's Crossing station opened as a flag stop north of Glen Road soon afterward. In 1839, the line was double tracked through the area.

Wellesley Farms station, which was designed by Henry Hobson Richardson prior to his death in 1886, opened south of Glen Road to replace Rice's Crossing in 1890. Like many B&A stations, it had attractive landscaping; Charles Mulford Robinson called it "unique, and to be remembered" in 1904.

The station was added to the National Register of Historic Places in 1986. In July 2004, the MBTA closed a paved crossing between the crossings in response to concerns about safety. Similar crossings exist at some other MBTA stations, but the agency's policy is to eliminate grade crossings whenever possible when building or renovating stations.

In June 2021, the MBTA issued a $28 million design contract for a project to add a third track from Weston to Framingham, including reconstruction of the three Wellesley stations and West Natick station. The project was expected to cost around $400 million, of which rebuilding Wellesley Farms station would be $34 million, with completion in 2030.

References

External links

MBTA - Wellesley Farms
Google Maps Street View: Croton Street entrance, Glen Road entrance, Hundreds Road entrance

MBTA Commuter Rail stations in Norfolk County, Massachusetts
Railway stations in the United States opened in 1890
Former Boston and Albany Railroad stations
Railway stations on the National Register of Historic Places in Massachusetts
Wellesley, Massachusetts
National Register of Historic Places in Norfolk County, Massachusetts